The 2002 WNBA season was their fourth season and their last in Orlando. The Miracle missed out of the playoffs by losing in a tiebreaker to the Indiana Fever. It was also the final season in Orlando.

Offseason

WNBA Draft

Transactions
May 24: The Miracle waived Andrea Congreaves and Anna Zimerle.
May 22: The Miracle waived E.C. Hill and Saundra Jackson.
May 18: The Miracle waived Tawona Alhaleem and Tomeka Brown.
May 12: The Miracle waived Jaclyn Johnson.
May 5: The Miracle waived Naomi Mulitauaopele, Alissa Murphy and Monika Roberts.
May 4: The Miracle waived Darene Thomas.
April 18: The Miracle acquired Clarisse Machanguana from the Charlotte Sting in exchange for a first round pick (seventh overall) in the 2002 Draft.

Roster

Season standings

Schedule

Preseason

Regular season

Playoffs
The Miracle tied for fourth place with the Indiana Fever. However, the Miracle lost two of the three regular season meetings with the Fever and therefore, the Fever took fourth place and advanced to the postseason for the first time ever.

Depth

Player stats
http://www.wnba.com/sun/stats/2002/

Awards and honors
Shannon Johnson and Nykesha Sales were named to the WNBA All-Star team.
Shannon Johnson was named WNBA Player of the Week for the week of June 9.
Nykesha Sales was named WNBA Player of the Week for the week of June 23.
Shannon Johnson was named to the All-WNBA Second Team for the third time in her career.

References

Orlando Miracle seasons
Orlando
Orlando Miracle